Gino Basso (born September 14, 1914) was an Italian basketball player who competed in the 1936 Summer Olympics.

He was part of the Italian basketball team, which finished seventh in the Olympic tournament. He played two matches.

External links
part 7 the basketball tournament

1914 births
Year of death missing
Italian men's basketball players
Olympic basketball players of Italy
Basketball players at the 1936 Summer Olympics